Muhammad Ali's Training Camp or "Fighter's Heaven" was a compound and training facility in Deer Lake, Pennsylvania built by former professional boxer and heavyweight champion, Muhammad Ali. Ali trained in the facility preparing for numerous fights, such as Rumble in the Jungle in 1974, and Thrilla in Manila in 1975.

History

1980s-90s 
After Ali's retirement from the ring, he sold the camp to George Dillman in 1997.

Present day 
Following Ali's death on June 3, 2016, Dillman reopened the compound to the public, including the gym, kitchen, and the cabins. It was then sold to Mike Madden, the son of John Madden, in July 2016.

Inside the compound 
After Ali bought the land in 1972, he began to build the cabins by cutting down trees, and getting logs. The compound included a visitors cabin, a gym, a dining hall, a mosque, and his family house. It also included a five stall barn for his horses and donkey. The compound included boulders that showed the painted names of boxing legends, friends, and opponents such as Sonny Liston, Joe Louis, Ali's trainer Angelo Dundee, and Joe Frazier.

References

Boxing gyms in the United States
Historic sites in Pennsylvania